Shantha Rangaswamy, (born 1 January 1954) is an Indian cricketer. She played Women's Test cricket for India in 16 matches from 1976 to 1991, captaining the side in 8 matches in 1976-77 and four in 1983–84. India recorded its first-ever test win in November 1976 against West Indies under Shantha's captaincy at the Moin-ul-Haq Stadium in Patna. She also played in 19 Women's One-day Internationals from 1981-82 to 1986, captaining the side in 16 matches from 1981-82 to 1983–84.

Career Statistics
A right-handed batter, she scored 750 runs at a batting average of 32.6 in her 16 Test matches, with one century (108), which was the first century by Indian Women Cricketer against New Zealand on 8 January 1977 at Carisbrook, Dunedin. She also took 21 wickets bowling right arm medium pace at a bowling average of 31.61, including a best analysis of 4–42 against England.

In 19 ODIs, she scored 287 runs at 15.1, and took 12 wickets at 29.41. She recorded her best batting and bowling performances in ODIs at the Women's Cricket World Cup in New Zealand in 1982, scoring her only ODI fifty (out for 50) against New Zealand, and taking 3–25 against an International XI. She is 1st Indian Woman Cricketer who made Century in Test Match (Vs New Zealand at Dunedin ) for India.

In October 2019, she became the first Indian female cricketer to represent the Indian Cricketers' Association and the BCCI Apex Council.

Personal life
Shantha was born to C. V. Rangaswamy and Rajalakshmi. She is the third born child and has six sisters.

Rangaswamy won the Arjuna award in 1976. She is now a cricket writer and is an executive (General Manager) at Canara Bank (Bangalore Region).

She is also the first recipient of the Lifetime Achievement Award for Women from the Board of Control for Cricket in India (BCCI).

Awards and recognitions

References

Notes

Further reading

External links
Profile from CricketArchive
Player profile from Cricinfo

1954 births
Living people
Recipients of the Arjuna Award
Indian women cricketers
India women Test cricketers
India women One Day International cricketers
Cricketers from Chennai
Tamil Nadu women cricketers
Indian women cricket captains
Sportswomen from Tamil Nadu